Matt Malone, S.J., (born 1972) is an American Catholic Jesuit priest, author, and journalist. He served as the editor-in-chief of America magazine and as president of its parent publisher, America Media, from 2012 to 2022. He entered the Society of Jesus in 2002 and was ordained to the priesthood in 2012 by Cardinal Edward Egan, former archbishop of New York.

Early life 
Matthew F. Malone was born on Cape Cod, Massachusetts and attended Mashpee Middle School and Falmouth High School. He is the fifth of sixth children born to an Irish-Catholic family. He was baptized at the parish of Our Lady of Victory in Centerville, Massachusetts and was confirmed at the Parish of Christ the King in Mashpee. He has written about the death of his brother in a drunk driving accident in 1984 and his father’s subsequent act of forgiveness.

Education 
Malone was the Massachusetts state champion and second-place national winner in the 1990 American Legion High School Oratorical Competition. For this achievement he was invited to address the Massachusetts General Court. Malone graduated from the University of Massachusetts Amherst where he majored in history.

Career 
Malone worked for the Massachusetts Democratic Party, serving as a field coordinator for the 1994 senatorial and gubernatorial nominees. From 1995 to 1997, he was an assistant to U.S. Representative Martin T. Meehan (D-MA). In 1997, Malone was named the founding deputy director of MassINC, a nonpartisan political think tank. He subsequently served as co-publisher of CommonWealth, MassINC’s quarterly review of politics, ideas and civic life. He was twice elected to the Planning Board in his hometown of Mashpee, Massachusetts and served as chairman during his second term.

The Jesuits 
Malone entered the Jesuits in 2002. After completing his novitiate in Syracuse, New York, he earned an M.A. in philosophy at Fordham University, studying under the renown Jesuit philosopher and teacher, W. Norris Clarke, S.J. From 2007-2009, Malone was an associate editor at America, where he covered U.S. politics and foreign affairs and oversaw the first re-design of the magazine in more than a decade. From 2009-2012, he studied theology at Heythrop College, a constitutive college of the University of London, where he earned first-class honors. He was also awarded a baccalaureate in sacred theology, summa cum laude, from the Catholic University of Louvain. While attending the University of London, Malone taught philosophy at the London campus of Fordham University.

Malone led America Media, formerly known as America Press, from 2012 to 2022. During his tenure, he developed and implemented a strategic plan for transforming the weekly print magazine into a multi-platform media company. Malone leveraged the equity in the organization’s headquarters building in Manhattan to invest in new technology, hire staff members and redesign the magazine and website. As of 2018, America Media had grown to include a staff of 45 employees with an annual budget of $10.5 million and an endowment of nearly $40 million. As of 2021, America Media reported 1.1 million unique digital visitors per month and a growing number of print and digital subscribers—the highest numbers in the organization’s history. During Malone’s tenure, in conjunction with a number of jesuit journals throughout the world, America published the first interview with Pope Francis. During his tenure, America also published: the first issue of a Jesuit magazine written and edited entirely by women; the most comprehensive survey of American Catholic women ever conducted; and the first journalistic interview with then-Vice President Joe Biden following the death of his son, Beau. Malone's profiles and interviews include former U.S. House Speaker John Boehner, Louisiana Governor John Bel Edwards, Broadway icon Vanessa Williams, and human rights activist Kerry Kennedy. He has been sharply critical of polarization, both in the church and in the secular world, and has made balance and viewpoint diversity editorial priorities during his time at America. Since 2012, America Media has won a record-number of awards and has twice been named magazine of the year by the Catholic Media Association, which honored the organization for “setting an incredibly high bar for intellectualism and spirituality.” In 2022, Malone announced that he and a team of journalists from America had conducted the first exclusive interview with Pope Francis for an American outlet. Malone announced in 2021 that he would step down as president and editor in chief in the autumn of 2022. He resigned both positions on November 30, 2022.

Malone has provided analysis and commentary on ecclesial and political events for most major news networks. He is a consultant for NBC News. He has provided commentary for NBC Nightly News, Hardball with Chris Matthews, Morning Joe, the BBC, NPR, the PBS NewsHour and the Charlie Rose Show. His work and ideas have been featured in The New York Times, The Washington Post and The Wall Street Journal, among others. He is the author of “Catholiques Sans Etiquette”(Catholics Without Labels), a book concerning the church and politics, which was published by Salvator Press in Paris.

Awards and distinctions 
Malone is a chaplain to the New York Press Club. In 2018 he was the presiding chaplain at the memorial service to mark the 50th anniversary of the death of Robert F. Kennedy at Arlington National Cemetery. Malone has twice co-published opinion columns with former U.S. Senator John C. Danforth.  He has also served on the boards of trustees of Boston College, the Catholic Medical Mission Board (CMMB), The Appeal of Conscience Foundation, and the Fulton J. Sheen Center for Thought and Culture. His column in America was named best regular column by the Catholic Press Association in 2018 and he has twice won the best essay award from the CPA. In 2022, Malone won a first place award for travel writing from the New York Press Club. He is also a recipient of The Cross "Pro Piis Meritis" pro Merito Melitensi from the Sovereign Military Order of Malta for his services to their mission to the United Nations and he is a recipient of The John Carroll Medal from The John Carroll Society.

References

Living people
1972 births
21st-century American Jesuits
People from Mashpee, Massachusetts
Falmouth High School (Massachusetts) alumni
University of Massachusetts Amherst alumni